Mohammad Omar (died October 8, 2010) was the Governor of Kunduz Province, Afghanistan. He was an ethnic Andar Pashtun from the Takhar Province of Afghanistan.

Omar completed two years of a four-year engineering program at Polytechnical University of Kabul.

Political life
Mohammad Omar served as the mayor of Taloqan from 1991 to 1992. During the civil war, he was a member of Islamic Dawah Organisation of Afghanistan. Soon after the fall of Taliban government, Omar was appointed as the governor of Baghlan Province where he served from 2001 to 2003.

He then served as Governor of Kunduz Province from 2004 until he was assassinated on 8 October 2010 when a bomb exploded at the Shirkat mosque in Taloqan, in neighboring Takhar Province. 19 people were killed from the bomb, also 35 were injured.

Political affiliation
Omar was formerly affiliated with Abdul Rasul Sayyaf's Islamic Dawah Organisation of Afghanistan, until the time of his death. He was said to be a man with good manners.

References

External links

Governors of Baghlan Province
Pashtun people
Islamic Dawah Organisation of Afghanistan politicians
2010 deaths
Deaths by improvised explosive device in Afghanistan
Mayors of places in Afghanistan
Assassinated Afghan politicians
People murdered in Afghanistan
People from Badakhshan Province
Governors of Kunduz Province
Year of birth missing